An election of the Members of the European Parliament from the Netherlands was held on 22 May 2014. This is the 8th time the elections have been held for the European elections in the Netherlands.

Background

Voting and election organisation

Active voting right 
To cast a vote (for the right to vote) in elections for the European Parliament. The voter should:
 have either the Dutch nationality or the nationality of a European Union member state;
 be 18 years or older;
 not be disqualified from voting.

Non-Dutch citizens who are nationals of other Member States of the European Union may vote
at the election of the European Parliament, provided that they:
 are living on the day of the candidates' nomination in the Netherlands;
 have attained the age of 18 on the day of the vote;
 are not disqualified from voting either in the Netherlands or in the Member State in which they are a citizen;
 have registered in a municipality with a statement that they want to vote in the Netherlands. (The so-called Y-32 form.)

Dutch nationals abroad have to register to vote for the elections to the European Parliament. Upon registration request, they must indicate whether they are voting by letter,
by proxy, or in person at a polling station in the Netherlands.
Dutch nationals living in another EU Member State must make a statement that they have not voted in the Member State in which they reside.

Dutch residents of Aruba, Curaçao and Sint Maarten have the same required as other Dutch living abroad.
Dutch residents on Bonaire, St. Eustatius, and Saba have no need to register, because these islands are part of the Netherlands. They may, as in other Dutch municipalities, vote at their polling stations.

The number of granted requests for registration in 2014 was 23,799 individuals. This was down from 39,601 registered international voters in 2009.
Of these registered voters, 21,017 indicated they wanted to vote by mail, 1,804 requested to vote in the Netherlands itself at a polling station, and 978 wanted to grant power of attorney to someone in the Netherlands.

Passive voting right 
To stand for election (for the right to be elected), a candidate should:
 have either Dutch nationality or the nationality of a Member State of the European Union;
 be eighteen years on the day of possible admission to the European Parliament;
 not be excluded from the right to vote.
Non-Dutch candidates from other Member States of the European Union must, in addition, be an actual resident in the Netherlands and not be excluded from the right
to be elected in the Member State of which they are a national.

Organisation of elections 

In elections for the European Parliament, the national electoral districts play no role in the nomination. The Netherlands consists of a single electoral district.
Political parties, therefore, take part in the elections with only a single candidate list.

Although the national electoral districts do play an important role in processing the election results.
The principal polling station of each constituency determines the vote total of the constituency.
The results of the vote are recorded in an official document and transferred to the Electoral Council.
The Electoral Council, in its role as the central electoral committee, then determines the result of the Netherlands' distribution of seats.

The transfer of the official recorded votes to the Electoral Council took place in 18 constituencies on Monday, 26 May 2014.
On Tuesday, 27 May, this transfer occurred for the two remaining constituencies where the municipalities Raalte, Kampen (constituency Zwolle), and Ouder-Amstel, (constituency Haarlem) experimented with a centralised counting of votes.

Casting a vote 
A voter could cast their vote at a polling station of their choice within their own district. At the
casting their vote, they could identify themselves with an identity document which is considered valid even if it has expired within the last 5 years.

Voters who voted in the election for the European Parliament in 2014 from outside the Netherlands experimented with a new model ballot.
In this new ballot, parties were allowed to show the party logo above their candidates if it had been registered in advance with the Electoral Council.

Participation of political groups 
On Monday, 14 April 2014, the Electoral Council had a public hearing on the validity of the
lists of candidates for the election of the Dutch seats for the European Parliament.
The candidate list of the Women's Party was declared invalid because the required deposit to participate (€11,250) was not paid.
Furthermore, the following candidates of the Party for the Animals were deleted because their documentation was incomplete and, as such, could not participate in the election:
T. Regan (United States);
W. T. Kymlicka (Canada);
J.M. Coetzee (Australia).

Numbering of the candidates list

Common lists 
A common list consists of 2 distinct parties which are sharing the same candidate list. The Christian Union and SGP formed a common list Christian Union-SGP for the European Parliament election.

Electoral alliances 
Several parties formed an electoral alliance.
 CDA/European People's Party and ChristenUnie-SGP
 PvdA/European Social-Democrats and GreenLeft

Election day 
Traditionally, all elections are held on Wednesday in the Netherlands.
Sunday is not an option because it's a resting day for Christians, while Friday and Saturday are impossible, because of the Sabbath.  Monday is also impossible, because then all preparation for an election would need to happen on the weekend. That leaves Tuesday, Wednesday and Thursday as possible election days. Many polling stations are located in schools, therefore, Wednesday is chosen because it is usually the quietest day of the week for classes.
However, the European Parliament Elections run from Thursday to Sunday across the entire European Union. Therefore, Thursday is the election day for the European Parliament Elections.

Treaty of Lisbon 

According to the Treaty of Lisbon, the Netherlands was awarded 26 seats in the European parliament. This is one more than the election of 2009.
The last elections were held when the treaty was not yet in effect, because not all member states had ratified the treaty.
The treaty came into effect during the last session of the European Parliament. The additional seat was then awarded to the Party of Freedom on 9 October 2011 based on the results of the 2009 election. This increased the numbers of seats for the PVV from 4 to 5 for the 2009–2014 session.

Campaign

Campaign posters

Polls
Poll results are listed in the tables below in reverse chronological order. The highest figure in each survey is displayed in bold type, and the background is shaded in the colour the party. In the instance that there is a tie, then no figure is shaded.

Seats

Percentages

Results

The Christian Democratic Appeal won the most seats and was seen as the winner of the 2014 elections, although Democrats 66 received more votes. The Christian Democratic Appeal got an extra seat due to their electoral alliance with Christian Union – Reformed Political Party. The eurosceptic PVV (Party for Freedom) was the biggest loser of the 2014 elections, though it only lost one seat. Contrary to other European countries, the eurosceptic movement did worse than previous elections.

Voter turnout was with 37.32%, which is a little higher than in 2009 (36.75%). Turnout was highest in Schiermonnikoog (70.95%) and lowest in Sint Eustatius (7.44%).

Seat assignment

Electoral quota
The electoral quota is the number of votes needed for one seat.
It is the total valid number of votes divided by the number of seats.
For this election it was 4,753,746 valid votes, divided by 26 seats.
The electoral quota was established as: 182.836

Electoral alliances
The results of the electoral alliances. Both parties of both alliances reached the electoral quota and are eligible for remainder seats.

Assigning full seats
Full seats are assigned by number of votes divided by the electoral quota.
Electoral alliances are marked as a letter, instead of a number.
Any seats left over are not yet assigned to a specific party.

Remainder seats
The remaining, or left over, seats are awarded sequentially to the lists with the highest average number of votes per seat.
Only lists that reached the electoral quota are eligible.

 CDA – European People's Party and Christian Union-SGP electoral alliance is awarded 2 seats
 PVV (Party for Freedom) is awarded 1 seat
 P.v.d.A./European Social Democrats and GreenLeft electoral alliance is awarded 1 seat

The election committee also calculated what would have happened without electoral alliances. In that case the CDA – European People's Party would have 4 seats instead of 5 and the Socialist Party 3 seats instead of 2.

Awarding seats within electoral alliances
To decide the seats per party for electoral alliances, the combination quota is first determined.
Combination quota for electoral alliances are determined by the total number valid votes divided by the awarded seats.
The party with the most votes left after the full seats are assigned gets the seat remaining.

List A
For list A, there were 1,086,609 votes divided by 7 seats.
The combination quota was established as: 155,229 votes

List B
For list B, there were 778,357 votes divided by 5 seats.
The combination quota was established as: 155,671 votes

Summary:
 The CDA – European People's Party list was awarded 5 seats.
 The Christian Union-SGP list was awarded 2 seats.
 The P.v.d.A./European Social Democrats list was awarded 3 seats.
 The GreenLeft list was awarded 2 seats.

European groups
Summary:
The ALDE remained the biggest group in the Netherlands. They increased their seats from 6 to 7, thanks to Democrats 66 seat win.
The PVV (Party for Freedom) founded and joined the ENF, they were Non-Inscrits before.
The SGP (Reformed Political Party) joined the ECR and left the EFD group. The Christian Union and SGP, which were in separate groups since 2009 rejoined the same group again.
The Party for the Animals joined the GUE/NGL group, increasing their seats from 2 to 3.
The G-EFA lost one seat, because GreenLeft lost one.

| style="text-align:center;" colspan="11" | 
|-
| style="background:#e9e9e9; text-align:center; vertical-align:top;" colspan="3"|European group
! style="background:#e9e9e9;"|Seats 2009
! style="background:#e9e9e9;"|Seats 2014
! style="background:#e9e9e9;"|Change
|-
|  style="background:gold; width:0.3em;"|
| style="text-align:left;" | Alliance of Liberals and Democrats for Europe
| style="text-align:left;" | ALDE
| style="text-align:right;" | 6
| style="text-align:right;" | 7
| style="text-align:right;" | 1 
|-
| 
| style="text-align:left;" | European People's Party
| style="text-align:left;" | EPP
| style="text-align:right;" | 5
| style="text-align:right;" | 5
| style="text-align:right;" | 0 
|-
| 
| style="text-align:left;" | Europe of Nations and Freedom
| style="text-align:left;" | ENF
| style="text-align:right;" | none
| style="text-align:right;" | 4
| style="text-align:right;" | 4 
|-
| 
| style="text-align:left;" | Progressive Alliance of Socialists and Democrats
| style="text-align:left;" | S&D
| style="text-align:right;" | 3
| style="text-align:right;" | 3
| style="text-align:right;" | 0 
|-
| 
| style="text-align:left;" | European United Left–Nordic Green Left
| style="text-align:left;" | EUL-NGL
| style="text-align:right;" | 2
| style="text-align:right;" | 3
| style="text-align:right;" | 1 
|-
| 
| style="text-align:left;" | The Greens–European Free Alliance
| style="text-align:left;" | Greens-EFA
| style="text-align:right;" | 3
| style="text-align:right;" | 2
| style="text-align:right;" | 1 
|-
| 
| style="text-align:left;" | European Conservatives and Reformists
| style="text-align:left;" | ECR
| style="text-align:right;" | 1
| style="text-align:right;" | 2
| style="text-align:right;" | 1 
|-
| 
| style="text-align:left;" | Europe of Freedom and Democracy
| style="text-align:left;" | EFD
| style="text-align:right;" | 1
| style="text-align:right;" | 0
| style="text-align:right;" | 1 
|-
| 
| style="text-align:left;" | Non-Inscrits
| style="text-align:left;" | NI
| style="text-align:right;" | 4+1
| style="text-align:right;" | 0
| style="text-align:right;" | 5 
|-  style="text-align:right; background:#e9e9e9;"
|  style="width:350px; text-align:right; background:#e9e9e9;" colspan="3"|
|  style="width:30px; "| 25(+1)
|  style="width:30px; "| 26
|  style="width:30px; "| 0 
|}

Elected members
23 members were directly elected by preference votes, though 28 members got enough preference votes.
To be elected by preference votes, 10% of the electoral quota is needed.
The electoral quota was 182,836. 10% of 182,836 = 18,284 votes.
Not all candidates could be appointed because either, the party did not get enough seats, or they got no seats.

Below are all the elected members of European parliament for the Netherlands. Members elected by preference votes are in bold.
The following 26 MEPs were officially announced by the Central Electoral Commission.

Democrats 66 (D66) – ALDE
 Sophie in 't Veld, by 568,185 votes (top candidate)
 Marietje Schaake, by 41,236 votes
 Gerben-Jan Gerbrandy, by 31,326 votes
 Matthijs van Miltenburg, by 16,698 votes

CDA – European People's Party
 Esther de Lange, by 415,011 votes (top candidate)
 Annie Schreijer-Pierik, by 113,123 votes
 Wim van de Camp, by 37,715 votes
 Jeroen Lenaers, by 36,428 votes
 Lambert van Nistelrooij, by 32,970 votes

PVV (Party for Freedom)
 Geert Wilders, by 290,239 votes (did not accept his seat)
 Marcel de Graaff, by 276,680 votes (top candidate)
 Vicky Maeijer, by 26,491 votes
 Olaf Stuger, by 4.021 votes

VVD
 Hans van Baalen, by 358,029 votes (top candidate)
 Cora van Nieuwenhuizen, by 86,237 votes
 Jan Huitema, by 26,031 votes

SP (Socialist Party)
 Dennis de Jong, by 300,782 votes (top candidate)
 Anne-Marie Mineur, by 52,187 votes

P.v.d.A./European Social Democrats
 Paul Tang, by 183,296 votes (top candidate)
 Agnes Jongerius, by 170,119 votes
 Kati Piri, by 10,351 votes

Christian Union-SGP
 Peter van Dalen, by 253,620 votes (top candidate)
 Bas Belder, by 53,995 votes

GreenLeft
 Bas Eickhout, by 184,154 votes (top candidate)
 Judith Sargentini, by 91,745 votes

Party for the Animals
 Anja Hazekamp, by 131,093 votes (top candidate)

Members not elected, but enough preference votes:
 VVD – Caroline Nagtegaal-van Doorn, by 19,370 votes (party did not win enough seats.)
 Christian Union-SGP – Stieneke van der Graaf, by 23,429 votes (party did not win enough seats.)
 Pirate Party – Matthijs Pontier, by 30,507 votes (party did not win any seat.)
 50PLUS – Toine Manders and Henk Krol, by 112,521 and 23,125 votes (party did not win any seat.)

MEPs in 2014–2019
Below is a list of members of the European Parliament for the period 2014–2019 as a result of this election.

Mutations

2014
 22 May: Election for the European Parliament in the Netherlands.
 11 June: The Party for the Animals joins the European United Left–Nordic Green Left group.
 16 June: The Reformed Political Party leaves the Europe of Freedom and Democracy group and joins the European Conservatives and Reformists group.
 26 June: The election committee elects Hans Jansen for the empty seat of Geert Wilders in the European Parliament, because Geert Wilders did not accept the seat. He has 10 days to accept or reject.
 1 July: Beginning of the 8th European Parliament session. (2014-2019)
 1 July: Hans Jansen is installed in the European Parliament as a replacement for Geert Wilders of the Party for Freedom. Geert Wilders never entered as an MEP.

2015
 5 May: Hans Jansen of the Party for Freedom dies at 72 years.
 2 June: The election committee elects Geert Wilders for the empty seat of Hans Jansen in the European Parliament. He has 28 days to accept or reject.
 15 June: The Party for Freedom founds and joins the Europe of Nations and Freedom group.
 23 July: The election committee elects Auke Zijlstra for the empty seat of Hans Jansen in the European Parliament, because Geert Wilders did not accept the seat. He has 28 days to accept or reject.
 1 September: Auke Zijlstra is installed in the European Parliament as a replacement for Hans Jansen. Auke Zijlstra was the first inline after Geert Wilders did not accept his seat (based on preference votes and list order).
 8 September: Auke Zijlstra joins the Europe of Nations and Freedom group.

2017
 15 March: Vicky Maeijer of the Party for Freedom leaves the European Parliament to take her seat in the Dutch Parliament after the 2017 Dutch general election.
 23 May: The election committee elects Geert Wilders for the empty seat of Vicky Maeijer in the European Parliament. He has 28 days to accept or reject.
 2 June: The election committee elects André Elissen for the empty seat of Vicky Maeijer in the European Parliament, because Geert Wilders did not accept the seat. He has 28 days to accept or reject.
 13 June: André Elissen is installed in the European Parliament as a replacement for Vicky Maeijer of the Party for Freedom.
 25 October: Cora Nieuwenhuizen-Wijbenga left the European Parliament to become the Minister of Infrastructure and Water Management in the Netherlands
 7 November: The election committee elects  for the empty seat of Cora Nieuwenhuizen-Wijbenga in the European Parliament. She has 28 days to accept or reject.
 14 November:  is installed in the European Parliament as a replacement for Cora Nieuwenhuizen-Wijbenga of the People's Party for Freedom and Democracy.

References

Netherlands
European Parliament elections in the Netherlands
2014 in the Netherlands